Surampalem is a village in Rajavommangi Mandal, Alluri Sitharama Raju district in the state of Andhra Pradesh in India.

Geography 

Demographics 
 India census, Surampalem had a population of 528, out of which 250 were male and 278 were female. The population of children below 6 years of age was 12%. The literacy rate of the village was 42%.

References 

Villages in Rajavommangi mandal